Boy Goes to Heaven, also known as A Boy Who Went to Heaven, is a 2005 South Korean film directed by Yoon Tae-yong, starring Yum Jung-ah and Park Hae-il.

Plot 
Ne-mo is a thirteen-year-old boy growing up in 1980s South Korea, and is the only child of a single mother who runs a watch repair shop in their small town. Having never met his father, Ne-mo resolves to marry a single mother when he is older. Following the suicide of his mother, Ne-mo becomes acquainted with Bu-ja, who opens a comic shop in his town. Bu-ja is also a single mother with a young son of her own, and Ne-mo instantly falls in love with her. Despite their age difference he proposes to her in a movie theater, but a fire breaks out and Ne-mo is killed saving Bu-ja's son.

Waking up in Heaven, Ne-mo finds himself in the middle of an argument between two angels, who can't agree whether his life was supposed to end at the age of thirteen or ninety-three. As a compromise they return him to Earth several days after he died, except he is now thirty-three years old and will age one year every day until he reaches ninety-three. Now an adult and with just sixty days left to live, Ne-mo poses as his own father and resumes his pursuit of Bu-ja.

Cast 
 Yum Jung-ah ... Bu-ja
 Park Hae-il ... adult Ne-mo
 Oh Kwang-rok
 Park Eun-soo
 Jeong Jin-gak
 Kim Kwan-woo ... young Ne-mo
 Hong So-yeon
 Jo Min-su ... Ne-mo's mother (cameo)

Release 
Boy Goes to Heaven opened in South Korea on 11 November 2005, and was ranked fourth at the box office on its opening weekend with 109,186 admissions. The film went on to accumulate a total of 242,053 admissions nationwide.

Critical response 
In a review for The Korea Herald, Yang Sung-jin praised the performance of child actor Kim Kwan-woo as "impressive and believable" and found Park Hae-il "true to form" as one of South Korea's leading actors, but criticized Yum Jung-ah for her "hackneyed" and overemphasised sexuality. Yang also regarded the relationship between the two main characters as inappropriate, noting that Bu-ja promises to marry Ne-mo when he is still a child and later has sex with him falsely believing that he is an adult, saying that while the character "is not a pedophile... she clearly—and at least initially—doesn't have motives as pure-hearted as Nae-mo's." Love HK Film.com described Boy Goes to Heaven as a "cute, fairly entertaining, but wholly inconsequential fantasy melodrama", and was critical of the director for a lack of attention to detail, in particular a reference to the age gap between the characters despite the film's 1980s setting.

References

External links 
 
 
 

2005 films
2005 romantic comedy films
South Korean romantic comedy films
Chungeorahm Films films
Showbox films
2000s Korean-language films
2000s South Korean films